Brand New Year is the second studio album and the first Christmas album from country music trio SHeDAISY; it was released September 26, 2000. The renditions of "Deck the Halls" and "Jingle Bells" both charted on the Billboard country charts in 2000, peaking at No. 37 and No. 44, respectively. It's best known for "Deck the Halls" appearing on Disney's 1999 Christmas film Mickey's Once Upon a Christmas.

Track listing
"Deck the Halls" (traditional) – 3:50 
"Santa's Got a Brand New Bag" (Kristyn Osborn, Jason Deere) – 3:08
"That's What I Want for Christmas" (Earl E. Lawrence) – 3:18
"Jingle Bells" (J.S. Pierpoint) – 3:57
"A Really, Really Merry Scary Intro" – 0:21
"Tinseltown" (Tim Nichols, Connie Harrington, Osborn) – 3:54
"Sleigh Ride" (Leroy Anderson, Mitchell Parish) – 3:15
"What Child Is This?" (traditional) – 4:20
"Hark! The Herald Angels Sing/Carol of the Bells" (Felix Mendelssohn, Charles Wesley, traditional) – 4:07
featuring tobymac
"The Secret of Christmas" (Sammy Cahn, Jimmy Van Heusen) – 4:08
"Christmas Children" (Leslie Bricusse) – 3:50
"Twist of the Magi" (Marcus Hummon, Osborn) – 4:27
featuring Rascal Flatts
 "Brand New Year (My Revolution)" (Richard Marx, Osborn) – 4:20 (9:27 overall)
[Silence] – 3:00 
"How Can I Keep from Singing?" – 2:07
 [Silence] hidden track – 0:04

Personnel 

 Tim Akers – keyboards
 Jeff Balding – Engineer, Mixing
 Steve Brewster – drums
 John Catchings – cello
 Eric Darken – percussion
 David Davidson – violin
 Mark Douthit – saxophone
 Connie Ellisor – violin
 Carl Gorodetzky – violin, string contractor
 Jim Grosjean – viola
 Jed Hackett – assistant engineer, mixing
 Robert Hadley – mastering
 Mark Hagen – assistant engineer, mixing, mixing assistant
 Aubrey Haynie – fiddle
 Dann Huff – acoustic guitar, electric guitar, conductor, producer, engineer, string arrangements, mixing
 Jack Jezioro – bass guitar
 Gordon Kennedy – acoustic guitar, electric guitar
 Anthony LaMarchina – cello
 Lee Larrison – violin
 James Lowry – acoustic guitar
 Jerry McPherson – acoustic guitar, electric guitar, bouzouki
 Kassidy Osborn – background vocals
 Kelsi Osborn – lead vocals
 Kristyn Osborn – background vocals
 Doug Sax – mastering
 Pamela Sixfin – violin
 Bobby G. Taylor – oboe
 George Tidwell – trumpet
 Alan Umstead – violin
 Catherine Umstead – violin
 Gary VanOsdale – viola
 Mary Kathryn Vanosdale – violin
 Kristin Wilkinson – viola
 Glenn Worf – bass guitar
 Jonathan Yudkin – fiddle, mandolin

Charts

Weekly charts

Year-end charts

References 

Lyric Street Records albums
SHeDAISY albums
Albums produced by Dann Huff
Christmas albums by American artists
2000 Christmas albums
Country Christmas albums